The Taebaek Mountains are a mountain range that stretches across North Korea and South Korea. They form the main ridge of the Korean peninsula.

Geography
The Taebaek mountains are located along the eastern edge of the peninsula and run along the eastern coast of the Korean Peninsula. The Hwangnyong Mountain in North Korea (1268 meters) forms the northern end of the range. Busan lies at the southern end of this mountain range, thus making the mountain range a total length of over 500 kilometers, averaging about 1000 meters in height.

Prominent peaks of the range include Mount Seoraksan (1,708 m), Mount Kumgangsan (1,638 m), Mount Taebaeksan (1,566.7 m) and Mount Odaesan (1,563 m). To the east, the mountain range falls steeply into the sea, but to the west, there are more gentle slopes. Many spurs stretch southwest. The most important rivers of South Korea, the Han River and the Nakdong River, both originate in the Taebaek Mountains.

Ecology
Many of the slopes are extensively covered in forests.

Industry
Economically the Taebaek mountains are important for the mining of iron, coal, tungsten, fluorite, and limestone.

Attractions
Manggyeongsa Temple in Hyeol-dong Taebaek, Gangwon-do Province at an altitude of 1,460 meters on Mount Taebaeksan, is a temple built to enshrine the statue of the Bodhisattva of wisdom. It was built by Jajang, a Silla Dynasty monk. The "Dragon Spring" at the entrance of the temple is known as the highest spring in Korea.

The 2018 Winter Olympics took place in Pyeongchang, Gangwon-do, located in the mountains.

Taebaek is also a name of a poomsae that is performed by the 3rd Dan black belts in Tae Kwon Do. Taebaek is mostly practised in Southern South Korea.

See also
 Baekdudaegan
 List of mountains in Korea
 Geography of South Korea

References

 
Mountain ranges of South Korea
Mountain ranges of North Korea